This is a list of wrestlers who have won the sumo second division jūryō championship since 1909, when the current championship system was established. These official tournaments are held exclusively in Japan.

The wrestler who has won the most jūryō championships is Masurao, with five.  Wakanami, Tagaryū and Terunofuji are the only wrestlers to have won a jūryō championship after winning a top division or makuuchi title. The only wrestlers to win the jūryō championship but never earn promotion to the top division are Genbuyama (1927), Sagahikari (1957), Tochiizumi (1983), Hidenohana (1988), Daigaku (1991), Hakuyozan (2021) and Tochimusashi (2022).

1958 to present
The first table below lists the champions since the six tournament system instituted in 1958. The championship is determined by the wrestler with the highest win–loss score after fifteen bouts, held at a rate of one per day over the duration of the 15-day tournament. In the event of a tie a play-off is held between the wrestlers concerned.
Names in bold mark an undefeated victory (a zenshō-yūshō). Figures in brackets mark the number of championships earned up to that tournament for wrestlers who won the championship more than once.

*Adachi would later become Zaonishiki 
*Ama would later become Harumafuji 
*Arakiyama would later become Niigiyama
*Azumanada would later become Misugiiso
*Daiki would later become Hokutofuji
*Daikikō would later become Terunoumi
*Hanada I would later become Tochinoumi 
*Hanada II would later become Takanohana I 
*Hoshi would later become Hokutoumi 
*Ishide would later become Shunketsu 
*Kawasaki would later become Taiga
*Kirinji I would later become Daikirin
*Kitao would later become Futahaguro
*Kōtetsuyama II would later become Itai
*Mitsuruyama would later become Shishihō 
*Nagahama would later become Yutakayama II
*Obori would later become Ōnishiki
*Satō would later become Takakeishō
*Takanohama would later become Toyonoumi
*Tamanonada would later become Tamanoshima
*Taniarashi would later become Yamaguchi 
*Togashi would later become Kashiwado 
*Uchida would later become Yutakayama I
*Wakahanada would later become Wakanohana III

1909 to 1957
The following tables list the champions before the introduction of the current tournament system.  The system was less regularized between years, with a different number of tournaments held at different times and in different venues, and often with a changing number of bouts fought in each tournament.

†tournament held in September

*Ayazakura would later become the Shōwa era Ayagawa Gorōji
*Genjiyama would later become Nishinoumi
*Hakkuniyama would later become Kashiwado
*Imaoshima would later become Tatekabuto 
*Iwahira would later become Wakabayama
*Iwakiyama would later become Kiyomigata
*Kakureizan would later become Tsurugamine
*Kanenohana would later become Otohira
*Mayaoroshi would later become Shitenryū
*Ononishiki would later become Kakogawa
*Uranohama would later become Urakaze
*Yonekawa would later become Asashio III

†these tournaments were actually held the following month*A yūshō system giving the wrestler with the best tournament record a prize was introduced by the Mainichi newspaper in the second half of 1909, and this was officially integrated by the JSA in 1926.  All tournaments predating the second tournament of 1909 did not recognize or award a championship.''

See also
Glossary of sumo terms
List of active sumo wrestlers
List of past sumo wrestlers
List of sumo tournament top division champions
List of sumo record holders
List of sumo stables
List of years in sumo
List of yokozuna

References

Sumo tournament winners
Second division champions